Shabnam Toluei (also spelt Toloui, born  in Tehran, Iran) is an Iranian actress, theatre director and playwright.  She is currently forbidden from working in Iran by the government because of her religion, the Baháʼí Faith, which is subject to state sanctioned persecution. Since December 2004 she is living in Paris, France. and became naturalized French citizen in 2019.

Biography
She has studied in the field of filmmaking in Tehran, in Bagh-Ferdos Film School and has her B.A. in Theatre Studies from Université Paris X, Nanterre, France. She has been writing short stories for cultural magazines since 1990, acting on stage since 1993, and writing plays since 1994.  Since 2002 she has also taught the bio-mechanic method and acting for camera at Kranameh culture and Art Training Institute in Tehran.

Experiences in Iran

Theatre in Iran 
 Romeo and Juliet, Shakespeare (Directed by Ali Raffi)
 The one thousand and first night (Written and Directed by Bahram Bayzai)
 Blood wedding, lorka (Directed by Ali Raffi)
 Shazde Ehtedjab, Hooshang Golshiri (Directed by Ali Raffi)
 The Maids, Jean Genet (Directed by Ali Raffi)
 Bizhan and Manizhe (Epic play based on Ferdowsi's Shahname) directed by Pari Saberi
 Kiss you and Tears, Charmshir (Directed by Mohammad Aghebati)
 Roya's room, Foroozand
 On the Earth, Foroozand
 Hamzad, Amir Dejakam
 Cries and demands by the city wall, Tankred Dorst, Directed by Hassan Majouni
 Tomorrow (*)
 Morad (*)
 The 7th Act (*), 1995
 Bitter Coffee (*) (Social drama, published in 2003)
 Bahman Baghdad (*)(a Romance based on Iran–Iraq War), 2003

(*): Plays written and directed by Shabnam Tolouei with Farda Theater Group in Iran.

Novel 
 My Dear Actor (Bazigar-e aziz-e man) (Cheshmeh Publication), 2002

Acting in feature films in Iran 
 A house Built on Water (directed by Bahman Farmanara)
 Sharareh (directed by Siamak Shayeghi)
 The Day I Became a Woman (directed by Marzieh Meshkini) DVD is available in Europe and US
 A notebook from the heaven, (daftari az aseman) Parviz Sheykh Tadi
 Chocolate, Afshin Sherkat
 A flower for Maryam, Hassan Aghakarimi

Acting in TV series in Iran 
 Hamsafar, Ghasem Jafari
 Inspector shamsi and madame, Marziye Boroumand
 Without Description, Mehdi Mazloumi
 A field where reeds grow (Neyestan), Mohamad Mokhtari

Acting in short films in Iran 
 No one talks to no one (Hich kas ba hich kas harf nemizanad), Bonakdar& Alimohammadi
 Love is alone (Eshgh tanhast), Bonakdar & Alimohammadi
 Desert of the mirrors (Kavir-e ayeneha), Bonakdar & Alimohammadi

Awards in Iran 
 The Best Actress in 14th International Fajre Theatre Festival, Iran, 1996
 The Second Best playwright in 14th International Fajre Theatre Festival, Iran, 1996
 The Second Best Actress in 15th International Fajre Theatre Festival, Iran, 1997
 The Second Best Director in 21st International Fajre Theatre Festival, Iran, 2003
 The Best Actress in 22nd International Fajre Theatre Festival, Iran, 2004

International Theatre Performances 
 Autumn Dance (director/playwright/actress) performed in Bing Studio Theatre, Stanford University 2017
 Autumn Dance, Stockholm, 9th Women Playwrights International Conference, 2012
 Autumn Dance (director/playwright/actress) performed in Persian and French language in paris/prague/stockholm/toronto/jonkoping 2011-2013
 Bitter Coffee, Silk road theatre festival in Ruhr, Mulheim, Germany, 2003
 Kiss you and Tears, Far and Near east festival in Berlin, German, 2004
 Kiss you and Tears in Freiburg, Germany, 2004
 Kiss you and Tears, Silk road theatre festival in Ruhr, Mulheim, Germany, 2004
 Kiss you and Tears, Sharjah festival, Sharjah, UAE, 2005
 Kiss you and Tears, Wiesbaden, Stuttgart, Heidelberg, Germany, 2006
 Kiss you and tears, Berlin, 2006

Experiences outside Iran

Film Making 
 Les étoiles, a documentary about women and violence (as filmmaker and editor) editing in progress, USA and France 2018-2019
 Dust-Flower-Flame a documentary about the life of Tahirih Qurratul Ayn (as filmmaker and editor) France 2015. The film is screened in different cities in the world like Paris, New York, London, Washington DC, Berkeley, Stanford University, Toronto, Montreal, Arizona, UCLA University, Chicago, San Francisco, etc. and was broadcast by BBC Persian TV in March 2017
 Etre pionnier dans la foie Baháʼíe (as director and editor)
 Take one (BARDASHTE YEK)/(as director and editor)/ short web documentaries about the followers of Baháʼí faith in France 2011-2012

Film Acting
 Mitra/Kaweh Modiri/Baldr Film Production
 Red Rose/Sepideh Farsi/ feature film/ 2013
 Women Without Men/ Shirin Neshat/ feature film/ 2009
 La torture blanche (Arash Naimian/ short film) 2009
 Munes (Shirin Neshat/ Video installation) 2007
 Au dernier recours (Nazmjou) Paris, 2006

Theatre
 Tarabnameh (Actress) by Bahram Beyzaei, performed in Stanford University 2016
 Bahman-bagdad (playwright and dictor), Krefeld, 2010-2012 for Krefeld city theatre in German Language with german actors 2010-2012
 Autumn Dance (director/playwright/actress) performed in Persian and French language 2011-2017
 L'entretien (as director and actress )/a Persian play by Mohammad Rahmanian, performed in French language /Lilas En Scène/ Paris 2006
 Louvre vue d'ailleurs, musical performance, in Louvre Museum / teamwork /Paris 2005

Radio Programs in Persian Language
 Tasvir 2006-2007 for Payamedoost radio
 Beresad be daste to 2008/ Payamedoost radio
 Sahba and me(pavaraghihaye mano sahba) 2009/ Payamedoost radio
 Album 2012-2013 /Payamedoost Radio

References 

Shabnam Tolouei: "Impact of Immigration on Professional Career" | Talks at Google
https://web.archive.org/web/20070810121726/http://www.marienbad.org/gastgruppen/kissyou.htm
https://web.archive.org/web/20070929080811/http://www.dramaturgische-gesellschaft.de/aktuelles/einladung.pdf

http://www.parstimes.com/theatre/female_playwrights.html
http://en.theater.ir/article.aspx?id=6841
http://www.chehrehnama.com/index.asp?PageAction=VIEWPROD&ProdID=4881
http://www.allocine.fr/personne/fichepersonne_gen_cpersonne=400802.html
http://news.cision.com/se/riksteatern/r/internationellt-hyllade-autumn-dance-pa-riksteaterturne,c9469203

External links
Shabnam Tolouei's YouTube Channel
Shabnam Tolouei's Instagram
Tavaana website interviews Shabnam Tolouei
 Shabnam Tolouie's Weblog
VOA interviews Shabnam Tolouei about her performance in Canada 2012 
Shabnam Tolouei's Facebook Page

Living people
People from Tehran
Actresses from Tehran
French Bahá'ís
Iranian Bahá'ís
20th-century Bahá'ís
21st-century Bahá'ís
Iranian women writers
Iranian film actresses
Iranian stage actresses
Iranian women film directors
Iranian diaspora film people
Iranian television actresses
Iranian dramatists and playwrights
Year of birth missing (living people)